Roger Kenyon (born 4 January 1949) is an English footballer who played for Everton between 1967 and 1979. He also played for the NASL team Vancouver Whitecaps during his career. He was part of the Everton side that won the First Division in the 1969–70 season; making 9 appearances in the process. He is remembered at Everton for scoring an own goal in the first replay of the 1977 League Cup Final; this game finished 1-1 and Everton lost the second replay 3-2 to Aston Villa.

He is now responsible for Blue Nose Promotions and organises events with sports personalities.

Career seasons

References

External links
 
 

1949 births
Living people
English expatriate footballers
English expatriate sportspeople in Canada
English footballers
Expatriate soccer players in Canada
Everton F.C. players
Vancouver Whitecaps (1974–1984) players
Bristol City F.C. players
Altrincham F.C. players
North American Soccer League (1968–1984) players
Sportspeople from Blackpool
North American Soccer League (1968–1984) indoor players
Blackpool F.C. players
Association football central defenders